Khun Poom Jensen (16 August 1983 – 26 December 2004), born Bhumi Jensen (also spelled Poomi Jensen, ;), was a grandson of King Bhumibol Adulyadej of Thailand, after whom he was named. He was also a nephew of Vajiralongkorn, the current King of Thailand. He was the only son of the King's eldest daughter, Princess Ubolratana Rajakanya, and her American (former) husband Peter Ladd Jensen.

Biography 
Poom, as he was commonly known, had autism and his status helped heighten awareness of the condition in Thailand. He attended Kasetsart University Laboratory School in Bangkok. He spent his childhood in San Diego County, California, where he graduated from Torrey Pines High School. Poom moved with his mother to Thailand in July 2001, after his graduation.

Death and legacy
Jensen drowned after being struck by the Indian Ocean tsunami on 26 December 2004, while he and his family were on holiday at the La Flora Resort hotel in Khao Lak. His body was discovered on the beach the following day. His uncle, then-Crown Prince Maha Vajiralongkorn, identified his body and flew the rest of the family to Bangkok. On 30 April 2005, he received a royal funeral attended by his grandfather the King and virtually every member of the Royal Family.

His mother, Princess Ubolratana, established the Khun Poom Foundation in his memory, to aid children with autism and other learning disabilities. She also founded "To Be Number One Project" to campaign against drug usage among teenagers.

Honors
  King Rama IX Royal Cypher Medal (First Class).

Police rank
 Police Sub Lieutenant

Volunteer Defense Corps of Thailand rank
 Volunteer Defense Corps Major

Ancestry

Notes

References

1983 births
2004 deaths
American people of Thai descent
American people of Danish descent
Deaths by drowning
Poom Jensen
Natural disaster deaths in Thailand
People from San Diego
People on the autism spectrum
Royalty and nobility with disabilities
Poom Jensen
Poom Jensen
Victims of the 2004 Indian Ocean earthquake and tsunami
Poom Jensen